The Caribbean lanternshark (Etmopterus hillianus) is a shark of the family Etmopteridae found in the eastern and western Atlantic at depths between 180 and 720 m.  Its length is up to 50 cm.

Reproduction is ovoviviparous.

References

 
 Compagno, Dando, & Fowler, Sharks of the World, Princeton University Press, New Jersey 2005 

Etmopterus
Fish described in 1861
Fish of the Dominican Republic